Yugoslavia sent 14 athletes to the 1978 European Athletics Championships which took place 29 August–3 September 1978 in Prague. Yugoslavia won two medals at the Championships.

Medalists

References 

Nations at the 1978 European Athletics Championships
Yugoslavia at the European Athletics Championships
1978 in Yugoslavia